La Regla (Spanish: The Rule) can refer to:

La Regla de Perandones, one of 54 parish councils in Cangas del Narcea 
Santería, a syncretic religion also called La Regla de Ocha or La Regla Lucumi

See also
Regla (disambiguation)